Adelphacme is a genus of flowering plants belonging to the family Loganiaceae.

Its native range is Southwestern Australia.

Species:

Adelphacme minima

References

Loganiaceae
Gentianales genera